Elderbank is a farming community in the Musquodoboit Valley area of the Halifax Regional Municipality, Nova Scotia at the junction of Routes 357 and 212. Elderbank is located in the Southeast Branch Musquodoboit. Other communities in this branch include, Meaghers Grant, Nova Scotia.

Communications
The postal Code is B0N 1K0 
The Telephone exchange is 902-384

Parks
Musquodoboit River - Elderbank Provincial Park

Navigator

References
Explore HRM

Communities in Halifax, Nova Scotia
General Service Areas in Nova Scotia